The 2009 Asian Women's Club Volleyball Championship was the 10th staging of the AVC Club Championships. The tournament was held in Nakhon Pathom, Thailand.

Pools composition
The teams are seeded based on their final ranking at the 2008 Asian Women's Club Volleyball Championship.

Preliminary round

Pool A

|}

|}

Pool B

|}

|}

Classification 9th–11th

Semifinals

|}

9th place

|}

Final round

Quarterfinals

|}

5th–8th semifinals

|}

Semifinals

|}

7th place

|}

5th place

|}

3rd place

|}

Final

|}

Final standing

Awards
MVP:  Onuma Sittirak (Federbrau)
Best Scorer:  Chen Liyi (Tianjin)
Best Server:  Nootsara Tomkom (Federbrau)
Best Spiker:  Onuma Sittirak (Federbrau)
Best Blocker:  Olga Nassedkina (Zhetyssu)
Best Libero:  Wanna Buakaew (Federbrau)
Best Setter:  Yu Jing (Tianjin)

References
Asian Volleyball Confederation
Volleyball Association of Thailand

2009 Asian Women's Club Volleyball Championship
International volleyball competitions hosted by Thailand
A
V
Sport in Nakhon Pathom province